The Mass Monarchs are an American professional basketball team based in Lynn, Massachusetts, and a member of The Basketball League (TBL).

History
On July 16, 2020, Evelyn Magley, CEO of The Basketball League, announced a new franchise called the South Shore Monarchs owned by Damon Harper  would be located in the South Shore area of Boston.

On May 15, 2021 the league announced the team would be owned by Dwayne Thomas.  He is the founder, chief executive officer, and chief learning strategist for ACES Network. The team announced that they would rebrand as the Massachusetts Monarchs for the 2022 season.

References

Basketball teams established in 2020
2020 establishments in Massachusetts
The Basketball League teams
Basketball teams in Massachusetts
Sports in Lynn, Massachusetts